Different World is the 18th studio album by British rock group Uriah Heep, released in 1991 in Europe and Japan, but not in North America. Different World was the first Uriah Heep studio album from which no single was released in the UK. It is the second studio album to feature this line-up. Bass guitarist Trevor Bolder produced the album and has said that, although it was an experience, he found it tricky wearing the hats of both band member/musician and producer.

The UK vinyl and cassette releases had the lyrics on the inner sleeve: the CD had nothing at all printed inside the insert, although whether this was by accident or design is unclear. Subsequent CD reissues printed the lyrics and had bonus tracks.

The UK tour was Heep's first in support of a new studio product since 1985. They had played just the one UK show for Raging Silence.

The track "Which Way Will the Wind Blow" is not to be confused with "Which Way Did the Wind Blow", a track performed by Shaw and Lanzon in their previous band Grand Prix in 1980.

Track listings

Personnel
Uriah Heep
Mick Box – guitars, backing vocals
Lee Kerslake – drums, backing vocals
Trevor Bolder – bass, backing vocals, producer, mixing
Phil Lanzon – keyboards, backing vocals
Bernie Shaw – lead vocals

Additional musicians
Brett Morgan – drums
Danny Wood – accordion
Benny Marshall – harmonica
Steve Piggott – keyboard programming
The "All God's Children" choir – Queen Elizabeth's Grammar School, Alford, Lincolnshire, England, conducted by Andrew Willoughby

Production
Roy Neave – engineer, mixing, computer programming
Mat Kemp – engineer

References

Uriah Heep (band) albums
1991 albums
Roadrunner Records albums